The honeycomb Izak or Natal Izak (Holohalaelurus favus) is a type of catshark in the Western Indian Ocean, near South Africa. It reaches a maximum length of around 50 cm. Since the mid-1970s, no specimens have been collected, even with recent biodiversity research cruises (2002 and 2003).

References

honeycomb Izak
KwaZulu-Natal
Marine fish of South Africa
honeycomb Izak